Proactive disclosure is the act of releasing information before it is requested. In Canada, this refers to an environment where information is released routinely through electronic means with the exception of information that the government is required to protect due to privacy risks. This could refer to information regarding citizens' social insurance numbers or military operations.

Proactive disclosure differs from reactive disclosure, as reactive disclosure occurs when a request is made, while proactive disclosure occurs without the filing of the request. Proactive disclosure has also been referred to as stealing thunder, active disclosure in the United States and suo moto disclosure in Latin which means upon its own initiative.

History 
The earliest way information was disclosed was seen in ancient Greece through criers or bellmen. Criers were hired in medieval times to walk the streets and call for attention, then read out important news such as royal proclamations or local bylaws. They would also play a role in passing the information across villages. This role changed when newspapers, radios, television and the internet became innovative parts of society.

Governments 
Within the government, proactive disclosure is meant to inform citizens of information that allows them to hold the government accountable. Information that puts private or public good in harm's way is not disclosed. This term is used frequently when discussing open government, meaning information is easily available to the public and at a regular basis due to the benefit of technology on disseminating information.

Many consider proactive disclosure and the ability to have access to information as a way to watch over those in power within society. This is especially true for governments who collect a wide range of information, which citizens often use to hold the government accountable.

Transparency and proactive disclosure are often associated in terms of creating open government.

Canada 
In the case of Canada, the government has specific measures under the Treasury Board of Canada that they proactively disclose data in order to highlight transparency and allow for the board to oversee public resources in the federal government.

However, all information released under proactive disclosure must be held under the Access to Information Act or the Privacy Act, with any information that is normally withheld under those acts not being disclosed on the website.

The Canadian government has also made promises to be open by default with proactive disclosure in their Open Government Partnership (OGP) Third Action Plan 

The open by default principle not only provides Canadians with proactive information release, but is also meant to improve efficiency for requests for information or the ability to gain information such as personal details about themselves. One of the key focuses is placed on the streamlining and increased progress on departments proactively disclosing information on spending and human resources online. The Government of Canada believes the proactive disclosure of information and self-service tools will strengthen the type of data being released.

For instance, they have to disclose financial resources within departments such as travel expenses and human resource material, and allow this information to be available on the department websites. This means that the department is more easily monitored by the body in power, as well as citizens. The three things that must be published are the travel and hospitality expenses of specific government officials, contracts over $10,000 and when positions are reclassified.

History in Canada 
Proactive disclosure came into Canada in 2004 when it came to disclosing information on contracts over $10,000 and position reclassification, with grants and contributions being under the proactive disclosure policy since 2005. The Treasury Board of Canada discloses and observes these policies.

The Canadian system was put in place in a way that allows for digital record management and could be a step towards a full proactive disclosure model at the federal level. There is an ongoing review of the Access to Information Act  and full proactive disclosure in the Office of the Information Commissioner of Canada.

The use of proactive disclosure at the federal level is seen within Natural Resources Canada, which has three web portals releasing raw data on subjects such as road networks, electoral boundaries, and topographic maps.

Municipal and provincial levels 
At the local level, open data and proactive disclosure are being linked together. Cities from Vancouver to Toronto began introducing open data portals in 2010. These initiatives are focusing primarily on providing raw data proactively to fill an open government model.

All provinces nationwide now provide online portals to disclose data. However, Quebec and British Columbia were the first provinces to focus on proactive disclosure.

Quebec was the first to look into proactive disclosure in Canada in 2006. In 2009, the province of Quebec also regulated that municipalities in the province would have to migrate to proactive disclosure for data and internal documents.

Federal 
Federally, the purpose is said to improve the role of Parliament and allow Canadians to hold both elected officials and public sector officials accountable. This is done through three main sections; travel and hospitality expenses, contracts and position reclassification.

Travel and hospitality expenses 
An example within Canada is the travel and hospitality reimbursement for government employees. The government has provided a web page to showcase the travel and hospitality expenses that occurred under the Treasury Board Secretariat by the President, Parliamentary Secretary and their exempt staff and senior level employees, such as deputy ministers and other equal levels. The proactive disclosure of this information is meant to highlight the agreements made under the National Joint Council in regards to the reimbursement of officials.

Contracts 
The government also has the proactive disclosure policy in regards to contracts that have a value of over $10,000. The website for the government sector will post document changes every three months, which includes new information or new contracts. The rule for this type of disclosure is once again laid out by the Treasury Board, as the governing body who monitors the government. The objective of this section is said to help construct services in a way that better represents a fair value for Canada. This type of information release means that contracts must also stand up against the eyes of Canadians, as well as apply to other government policies and agreements.

Position reclassification 
The government of Canada also announced in 2004  that information on position changes or reclassification of a position in the public service must release the information to Canadians. They state that the website must release this information and meet the guidelines set out by the Treasury Board of Canada. Reclassification can include changes such as:
 Department or program mandate change
 Manager reorganization
 More effective employment plans
 Response to vacancies
 Classification grievances
 External conditions with resource change
In order to ensure the change in reclassification is done openly, especially in regards to the cost associated, the Canadian government states they will strive for publicly displaying the knowledge and being transparent and accountable for these decisions.

Debate over proactive disclosure in Canada 
Proactive disclosure is often debated as it does not cover all realms of government employees. Elected officials expenses or those not listed directly under the act are not obligated to disclose this information. This has caused scandals both in the House of Commons and the Senate, such as in 2012 in the case of Senator Duffy and in 2016 for Chief of Staff, Katie Telford and Principal Secretary Gerald Butts. Both scandals involved a case where money was not disclosed for an amount that was seen as too expensive, where neither party was required to disclose details of their expense.

Open government and proactive disclosure in Canada is currently under review following recommendations by the Information Commissioner of Canada.

India
In India, the Right to Information Act, has a clause seeking that governments and public institutions should suo moto or pro-actively share information with the public. The act visions that this pro-active disclosure clause should be implemented fully, such that citizens do not have a need to seek information by filing requests under this act. The use of internet, through the institution's web-sites for disseminating information is seen as a method of fulfilling this requirement.

Large organizations and private companies 
For large organizations or private companies, transparency and proactive data are often linked as this term indicates the way in which they must be proactive rather than reactive in the spreading of information.  Proactive disclosure is also seen as when an organization such as a transnational corporation releases information before it is released by a third party such as the media, which takes away some of the third party's power. This practice has also often been linked to transparency within an organization. In some cases, organizations have been seen as avoiding disclosing information in this way due to negative coverage or to cover up information.

Private companies and large organizations are often held accountable through audits.

References

Information governance